Michalis Kritikopoulos (3 January 1946 – 20 July 2002) was a Greek professional footballer who played as a striker.

Career
Born in Kaisariani, Kritikopoulosa began playing football as a striker for local side G.S. Kaisariani in 1962. In 1964, he joined Ethnikos Piraeus F.C., where he would play for nine seasons.

In 1973, Kritikopoulosa joined Olympiacos where he played until 1980, winning three Alpha Ethniki and one Greek Football Cup titles. He finished his career with Apollon Athens F.C., retiring in 1981 at age 35. All told, Kritikopoulos scored 175 league goals making him one of the league's all-time leading goal-scorers.

Kritikopoulos made 28 appearances and scored three goals for the Greece national team from 1969 to 1977. He made his debut in a friendly against Australia on 19 July 1969.

Personal life
In 2002, Kritikopoulos died from a cardiac arrest whilst playing in a friendly match for Olympiacos' veterans in Andros. Ethnikos Asteras has since named its football stadium after Kritikopoulosa.

References

External links

1946 births
2002 deaths
Footballers from Athens
Greek footballers
Association football forwards
Greece international footballers
Panegialios F.C. players
Ethnikos Piraeus F.C. players
Olympiacos F.C. players
Apollon Smyrnis F.C. players
Super League Greece players